Ambronay—Priay station (French: Gare de Abronay—Priay) is a French railway station located in commune of Ambronay, Ain department in the Auvergne-Rhône-Alpes region. As its name suggests, the station also serves the nearby commune of Priay. It is located at kilometric point (KP) 61.274 on the Mâcon—Ambérieu railway.

The station was opened in 1856 by the Compagnie des chemins de fer de Paris à Lyon et à la Méditerranée (PLM).

As of 2020, the station is owned and operated by the SNCF and served by TER Auvergne-Rhône-Alpes trains.

History 

In 2019, the SNCF estimated that 9,145 passengers traveled through the station.

Services

Passenger services 
Classified as a PANG (point d'accès non géré), the station is unstaffed without any passenger services.

Train services 
As of 2020, the station is served by TER Auvergne-Rhône-Alpes line 30 trains between Mâcon and Ambérieu.

Intermodality 
In addition to passenger vehicle parking, the station is equipped with storage racks and facilities for bicycles.

The station is also served by TER bus and car service in addition to trains.

See also 

 List of SNCF stations in Auvergne-Rhône-Alpes

References 

Railway stations in Ain
Railway stations in France opened in 1856